Nese may refer to:

 Nese, Italy, a village in northern Italy
 Nese, Norway, a village in south-western Norway
 Nese language, an Oceanic language or dialect spoken in Vanuatu
Tony Nese, American professional wrestler

See also
 Neşe, a Turkish female given name